Pothole Gulch is a gulch whose bed is broken by numerous potholes, draining the southeast portion of Vindication Island, South Sandwich Islands. The descriptive name was applied by United Kingdom Antarctic Place-Names Committee (UK-APC) in 1971.

Valleys of Antarctica
Landforms of South Georgia and the South Sandwich Islands